Muhammad al-Ghafri is a Syrian judge who served as justice minister from 2004 to 2009.

Career
Ghafri was a counsellor at Syrian state council. He served as justice minister from October 2004 to April 2009 in the cabinet headed by then prime minister Mohammad Naji Al Otari, replacing Nizar Al Issa in the post. Ghafri was in office until April 2009 and succeeded by Ahmad Younes as justice minister. Then he was appointed head of the corruption combating committee

References

Living people
Arab Socialist Ba'ath Party – Syria Region politicians
Syrian ministers of justice
Year of birth missing (living people)